Refund was an American Thoroughbred racehorse. Ridden by Fred Littlefield, he won the 1888 Preakness Stakes.

Pedigree

References

1885 racehorse births
Thoroughbred family 4-r
Racehorses bred in Maryland
Racehorses trained in the United States
Preakness Stakes winners